Veysi (also Romanized as Veysī; also known as Gol-e Zard-e Veysī and Veysīl-e Golzardī) is a village in Tashan-e Sharqi Rural District, Tashan District, Behbahan County, Khuzestan Province, Iran. At the 2006 census, its population was 1,032, in 218 families.

References 

Populated places in Behbahan County